Nikolaos (Nikolas) Chr. Stampolidis  is a Greek archaeologist who specializes in Geometric and Archaic early Greek history.

Early life
Stampolidis was born and grew up in Chania, Crete. His parents were refugees from Asia Minor, who emigrated to Greece during the forced population exchange of 1923.

Career
Stampolidis obtained a degree in archaeology from the Aristotle University of Thessaloniki (Department of History and Archaeology) in 1974. He then pursued graduate studies at the University of Bonn (1975-1978) and completed his doctorate at Thessaloniki (1979), where he was a student of Manolis Andronikos. In 1984, he was elected a Lecturer at the University of Crete, where he was a full Professor of Classical Archaeology, until his retirement. Stampolidis has excavated sites in Vergina, Chalkidiki, Rhodes and Crete. Since 1985, he has been excavating the site of Eleutherna. Stampolidis is also the Director of the Museum of Cycladic Art in Athens and a member of the Central Archaeological Council of Greece. He is now in charge of the general direction of the Acropolis Museum.

Honors and awards
 Member of the German Archaeological Institute (DAI)
 Commander of the Order of the Phoenix of the Hellenic Republic

See also
Eleutherna
Museum of Ancient Eleutherna
Goulandris Museum of Cycladic Art

References

External links
Greek archaeologist Nikos Stampolidis, The Financial Times, 1.5.2015
Νίκος Σταμπολίδης: Τα μουσεία πρέπει να είναι τα σχολεία της κοινωνίας, Καθημερινή, 30.12.2013
Museum of Ancient Eleutherna

1951 births
Greek archaeologists
Academic staff of the University of Crete
Aristotle University of Thessaloniki alumni
Living people
Commanders of the Order of the Phoenix (Greece)
People from Chania